William Henry Brimblecombe (5 January 1876 – 1917) was an English footballer who played in the Football League for Bury.

References

1876 births
1917 deaths
English footballers
Association football forwards
English Football League players
Burnley F.C. players
Rossendale United F.C. players
Bacup Borough F.C. players
Bury F.C. players
Accrington Stanley F.C. (1891) players
Footballers from Burnley